Qty or QTY may refer to:
Quantity, property that can exist as a multitude or magnitude
QTY (band), American indie rock band